Camp Cold Brook is an American supernatural horror film directed by Andy Palmer. The film, which is produced by Joe Dante, stars Danielle Harris and Chad Michael Murray.

Plot
A paranormal team sets to check out the abandoned Camp Cold Brook where a mass murder had taken place decades previous.

Cast

 Danielle Harris as Angela
 Chad Michael Murray as Jack
 Courtney Gains as John Brierwitz
 Candice De Visser as Emma
 Michael Eric Reid as Kevin
 Cate Jones as Waitress
 Juliette Kida as Receptionist
 Loren Ledesma as Connie
 Jason Van Eman as O'Connor
 Katie Fairbanks as Hatchet Face Girl
 Mary Kathryn Bryant as Anise Bernadeau
 Maddie Perry as Girl
 Jacob Dever as Young Jack
 Corbin Tyler as Masked Boy
 Mary Buss as Esther (as Mary Fjelstad-Buss)
 Debbi Tucker as Church parishioner
 Samantha Lee as lead camp counselor
 Lauren Hemm as Ghost Girl #6
 Emma Dennin as Camper
 Spivey as BigDaddyKane III

Production
Principal photography started in July 2017 and wrapped in August 2017 in Oklahoma.

Reception 
Rotten Tomatoes gave this film  rating based on  critic reviews.

References

External links
 

2018 films
Films set in the 21st century
Films shot in Oklahoma
American supernatural horror films
Films set in Oklahoma
Films about television
American ghost films
Films about summer camps
2010s English-language films
2010s American films